Cedarpines Park is an unincorporated community in San Bernardino County, California, United States. Cedarpines Park has a post office with ZIP code 92322. The post office opened in 1927 and was closed from 1943 to 1946.

References

Unincorporated communities in San Bernardino County, California
Unincorporated communities in California